Elling is both a surname and a given name. Notable people with the name include:

Surname:
 Aaron Elling, American Football player
 Ægidius Elling, Norwegian inventor
 Catharinus Elling, Norwegian musician
 Kurt Elling, American musician

Given name:
 Elling Carlsen (1819–1900), Norwegian skipper
 Elling Eielsen (1804–1883), Norwegian-American minister and Lutheran Church leader
 Elling Holst (1849–1915), Norwegian mathematician, biographer and children's writer
 Elling Olsson Walbøe (1763–1831), Norwegian politician
 Elling Rønes (1882–1965), Norwegian cross country skier
 Elling M. Solheim (1905–1971), Norwegian poet, playwright and short story writer

Norwegian-language surnames
Norwegian masculine given names